Lines of Escape is a Canadian comedy-drama film, directed by Miryam Bouchard and Catherine Chabot and released in 2022. Adapted from Chabot's stage play, the film centres on Audrey (Chabot), Valérie (Léane Labrèche-Dor) and Sabina (Mariana Mazza), three high school friends who are having a reunion party at age 30, only to find their bond tested by the ways in which they have grown apart, becoming radically different from each other in their lives and values, in adulthood.

The cast also includes Maxime de Cotret as Audrey's boyfriend Jonathan, Mickaël Gouin as Valérie's boyfriend Paul-Émile and Victoria Diamond as Sabina's girlfriend Amber, as well as Antoine Vézina, Marc Auger-Gosselin, Thierry Bellevue, Stéphanie Bélanger, David Cloutier, David Corriveau, Robert Di Loreto, Isabel Dos Santos, Hugo Giroux and Nora Guerch in supporting roles.

The film opened in theatres on July 6, 2022. It was the last film ever theatrically distributed by Les Films Séville before its shutdown.

Jean-François (Jafaz) Ferland, Marie-Claude Lafontaine and Charles Lamoureux received a Canadian Screen Award nomination for Best Visual Effects at the 11th Canadian Screen Awards in 2023.

References

External links

2022 films
2022 comedy-drama films
2022 LGBT-related films
Canadian comedy-drama films
Canadian LGBT-related films
LGBT-related comedy-drama films
Quebec films
French-language Canadian films
2000s Canadian films
Films set in Quebec
Films shot in Quebec
Films based on Canadian plays